The Czech Open in badminton is an international open held in the Czech Republic since 1993. This tournament followed the Czechoslovakian Open and is often used by European, in particular Danish, new generation talents as jump board into the European point. In 2018, the Český Badmintonový Svaz held two level 4 tournaments, the International Series in Karviná, and the International Challenge in Brno, which held in March and September, respectively.

Previous winners

Czech Open

KaBaL International Karviná

Performances by nation

Czech Open

KaBaL International Karviná

References

External links 
 Český Badmintonový Svaz

Badminton tournaments
Badminton tournaments in the Czech Republic
Sports competitions in the Czech Republic
Recurring sporting events established in 1993
1993 establishments in the Czech Republic